Palojoki (literally "fire river") is a village of about a thousand inhabitants in Nurmijärvi, Finland. It is located close to the border of Tuusula, about 30 kilometers north of Helsinki, and the regional road 139 (Palojoentie on the Nurmijärvi side, Nahkelantie on the Tuusula side) runs from the Nurmijärvi's church village to Hyrylä, Tuusula. The village has a primary school called Palojoki School (Palojoen koulu).

The village is named after the adjacent Palojoki River, which flows into the Vantaa River near the village. The area of the village is about 50 km2 and its highest point (Haukkaankallio) is about 50 m above sea level. Palojoki is home to one of the nationally significant built cultural environments defined by the Finnish Heritage Agency.

Aleksis Kivi
The most famous resident of Palojoki is the Finnish national author Aleksis Kivi (1834–1872), whose birthplace currently serves as a museum. The Kivi Festival (Kivi-juhlat), which features plays by Aleksis Kivi, is held in the summer on Taaborinvuori in the village. Kivi describes his home village as follows:

See also
 Nukari

Literature
 Tarja Raninen: Nummisuutareiden naapurit. Palojoen kyläyhdistys, Rusutjärvi: Reuna, 2013. . (in Finnish)

References

External links
 Palojoki - Aleksis Kiven jalanjäljillä (in Finnish)

Aleksis Kivi
Cultural heritage
Nurmijärvi
Villages in Finland